Let's! TV Play Classic (Let's!TVプレイCLASSIC or レッツテレビプレイ クラシック) is a series of Japan-only plug & play devices developed and distributed by Bandai programmed on XaviX software created by SSD Company Limited in 2006 that contain arcade games from either Namco or Taito, with Namco's being called "Namco Nostalgia" while Taito's are called "Taito Nostalgia". Each device in the series contains 4 games, with 2 being classic arcade games while the other 2 are new games using the original game's sprites developed by Bandai.

Namco Nostalgia 1
Xevious
Mappy
Xevious: Scramble Mission - In Scramble Mission the Solvalou ship flies through a futuristic fortress that has technological obstacles that the player must dodge, and at the end of each level they must blow up a boss similar to GAMP, under a time limit.
Mappy: Revenge of Nyamco - A game similar to Breakout where the player controls two Meowkies at the bottom of the screen who are moving a trampoline and catching Nyamco. Nyamco is attempting to bounce up and break blocks to obtain the items Mappy took from him in the previous game.

Namco Nostalgia 2
Gaplus
Dragon Buster
Gaplus Phalanx - The enemies do not shoot at the player, similar to the challenge stages in the original game. The player's ship has a Phalanx powerup at all times and must capture blue enemy ships which if caught would move to the top half of the screen spell a word as in the original Gaplus challenge stages. However red ships in this game if caught will erase a small part of the word, and the player must spell at least the word to continue to the next stage. All excess ships caught fill the rest of the background and count as a bonus. Ships can still fly into and hurt the player. The ships are also recolored and the background is blue instead of black.
Dragon Buster 100 - Clovis must rescue Celia again but this time he has to travel through 20 linear levels, and each level has four room guardians and a boss dragon at the end (There are 100 enemies hence the name 100.) There are no regular enemies throughout the game or obstacles such as vines to climb and there is only one linear path. Every 25 levels there is a cutscene where Clovis reaches Celia, but she gets captured by another dragon, except after the 100th level when she and Clovis kiss. After level 50 the dragons that Clovis fights become two headed, and after level 75 they have three heads. These dragons have much more HP than the one headed ones. Also, the color of the enemies and dragons changes throughout the game. Clovis can also use new items from the Famicom version of Dragon Buster to help him with his quest including rods, lamps, amulets, rings and a different type of crown. However, there is no scepter or original crown and Celia changes her outfit in the same manner as in the original game at every cut-scene without any special conditions needed to be fulfilled.

Namco Nostalgia 3 (Cancelled)
Namco Nostalgia 3 was scheduled to release four months after the original plug and plays, but was ultimately cancelled. It was supposed to include the games Bravoman and the Tower of Druaga and arranged versions of them.
Bravoman
The Tower of Druaga
Bravoman (Arrangement) - Wonder Momo, who has interacted with Bravoman in crossover games and media was set to be playable in the arranged version of the game.
The Tower of Druaga (Arrangement) - There would have been four new playable characters.

Taito Nostalgia 1
The Legend of Kage
Golden Castle
The Revised Legend of Kage - It is now possible to play as two new characters called Ayame and Ganin. Ayame is a female ninja who can throw bombs similar to the red ninjas in the game and has an unlimited supply of throwing knives. Ganin is a dog who can breathe fire similar to the monks in the game and can perform a spin attack that does not have much range but leaves him invulnerable for an instant and kills any enemy that touches him. Gameplay is identical to the original Legend of Kage except that there is a new snake boss at the end of every second playthrough. It slithers on the ground and blocks the exit.  It is also possible to unlock Kage in the arranged version of the game to play with the new final boss.
Amazons Golden Castle - There is a new playable character who is a female gladiator called Sana of the Amazons. She shoots arrows instead of using a sword and attacks her bow and arrows. Her supply of arrows is endless, and she can block with her bow. The gameplay is otherwise identical to the original game except there is new a final boss who is fought in the treasure room. It is a new, stronger, gold colored form of the Skeleton of Gaius. It is possible to unlock Guiranos in the arranged version of the game to play with the new final boss.

Taito Nostalgia 2
KiKi KaiKai
Slap Fight
KiKi KaiKai Kackremboh - It is now possible to play as Bonze Kackremboh, the buddhist monk from the Taito game Bonze Adventure. Kackremboh attacks by throwing prayer beads in three directions at once, which become larger when he collects ofuda powerups instead of firing faster which is what occurs when Sayochan collects Ofuda, and he can also use Gohei (Sayochan's purification wand).Gameplay is the same, except there is a new boss at the end of Area 8 on the boat which is a white Maneki-neko. It throws brown hair balls. The color of the sail of the boat and its symbol also change during this fight. It is possible to unlock Sayochan in the arranged version of the game to play as her with the new final boss.
Slap Fight Tiger - It is now possible to play as Tiger Heli from the Tiger Heli series; Tiger shoots differently, and the powerups function differently for Tiger. The gameplay is otherwise the same except for a new boss at the end of the game; Taito's Space Invaders appear at the end of the game and behave as they did in the original Space Invaders. Two machines appear on the bottom of the screen and create a laser beam between each other, that keeps the player's ship from moving vertically, emulating the original space invaders. There are no stationary defense bunkers though, but the player keeps their power-ups during the boss fight. The Space Invaders defend the red energy core, and only after defeating them can the player blow it up. It is possible to unlock the original ship in the arranged version of the game to fight the new final boss with it.

External links
Official website 
Photos
Recall Information 
Information regarding the cancelled Namco Nostalgia 3 
The Japanese Wikipedia Article of Let's TV Play Classic 
Amazon listings for Let's TV Play Classic 

Arcade hardware
Japan-exclusive video games
Mappy
Bandai Namco Entertainment franchises
Square Enix video game compilations
Bandai Namco video game compilations
Taito games
Video game consoles
Video game franchises
Xevious